The Soue is a small river in the Dordogne department of France. It is a tributary of the Blâme and part of the Dordogne basin. The river rises in the commune of Granges-d'Ans, flows through Sainte-Orse and empties into the Blâme on its right bank, near Brouchaud.

See also
 List of rivers of France

References

Rivers of France
Rivers of Nouvelle-Aquitaine
Rivers of Dordogne